Joe Knight, (January 15, 1909 – July 1, 1976) was an American boxer born in Cairo, GA.  The National Boxing Association awarded Knight the World Light Heavyweight title in 1933.

Early life
Knight was born on January 15, 1909, in Cairo, Georgia.  He turned pro in 1927, and knocked out "Battleship Sword" in the fall of that year.

Early career, 1931-2
On May 22, 1931, New York native Yale Okun became his fifth round knockout victim in Miami.  The final blow was a straight right to the jaw.  Knight battered Okun with his left for four rounds before ending the bout in the fifth.

Knight gained revenge against Spike Webb in ten rounds in Miami on August 7, though knocked to the mat in the fourth.  He had lost to Webb the previous month, taking a knockdown in the first.

Knight won an unpopular decision over Tony Cancela on January 7, 1932, in Miami.  Cancela drilled staggering rights to the head of a groggy Knight in the closing round.  Many ringside believed Cancela, the bout's consistent aggressor, should have earned the decision with a comfortable margin.

Don Petrin, who claimed a late foul, fell to Knight in a fourth round knockout at Miami's Biscayne Arena on February 15, 1932.  The bout had originally been scheduled for ten rounds.

Charley Belanger lost to Knight on May 23, 1932, in a ten-round split decision in Boston.  Knight had a considerable lead in the first four rounds, but experienced an assortment of blows to the body in the remaining six.  He closed strong in the final rounds scoring several times with lefts to the head.  The decision was unpopular with the crowd who felt Belanger had gained a winning margin on points in the last six rounds.

On the first of July, 1932, Knight challenged Bob Godwin for the Southern Light Heavyweight Title at Daytona Beach, and received a ten-round draw decision. Godwin had formerly taken the title from Knight.  Knight, who had previously lost the title to Godwin, initially led, but slowed in the last two rounds before Knight's relentless attack. The crowd appeared satisfied with the draw decision in the savage bout.

Knight faced George Courtney on September 19, 1932, winning at the end of the fifth from a technical knockout in Laurel, Maryland.

He decisively defeated reigning World Light Heavyweight Champion George Nichols before three thousand in Charleston, South Carolina on October 17, 1932, in a non-title ten-round decision.  Knight charged into his opponent from the opening bell, and Nichols failed to take a round.

Chick Raines fell to Knight in a ten-round points decision on November 23, 1932, in Savannah.

Natie Brown lost in  a fifth round technical knockout to Knight on November 29, 1932, in Jacksonville, Florida. Brown was reported to have suffered a broken jaw and was unable to continue.

Knight defeated Owen Phelps on December 6, 1932, in a ten-round bout for the Southern Light Heavyweight Title in Alexandria, Virginia.  Knight was given every round, and knocked Phelps to the mat for a no count in the fourth.  Phelps was required to clinch, hold, and back away to endure Knight's attack.

Battling Bozo lost on February 13, 1933, in a ten-round points decision at Daytona Beach.  Knight may have taken every round, but his opponent avoided a knockout with an effective defense.

Awarded the NBA World Light Heavyweight Title, 1933
In 1933, the National Boxing Association awarded Knight the World Light Heavyweight title.

Losing the NBA World Light Heavyweight Title to Bob Godwin, March, 1933
Knight lost the NBA World Light Heavyweight title to contender Bob Godwin on March 1, 1933, in a ten-round points decision at Legion Arena in West Palm Beach, Florida.  Godwin employed excellent blocking and though he took many hard licks in the lengthy bout, he was the aggressor throughout and won the infighting, particularly after Knight tired by mid-bout.  Godwin took two of the first five rounds, with three even.  Drawing on remarkable stamina, the 21-year old Godwin won the next four rounds, leaving the tenth even. Godwin took a beating in the bout, with both eyes badly swollen by the end.  It was a primitive match requiring limited boxing skill or ring generalship.  Knight won only two of the five meetings between him and Godwin.

Max Marek, the tenth ranked heavyweight in the world, fell to Knight in a ten-round points decision at Miami Beach on April 13, 1936.  Though giving up fifteen pounds, Knight used his speed and experience to his advantage.  The bout one of Knight's best displays of skill.  In the third, he nearly staggered Marek with a left to the chin, but Marek fought back harder, and remained the aggressor throughout much of the bout, delivering a variety of solid punches. In a brutal bout, Knight closed well in the last three rounds, clipping two lefts to the chin of Marek in the tenth.

Knight beat Lou Scozza at the Biscayne Arena in Miami on June 12, 1933, in a ten-round points decision.  Knight shelled Scozza with hard  lefts and right for most of ten rounds.  Though Scozza rallied in the ninth, he was unable to overcome the lead that Knight had piled up.  Four thousand spectators watched the judges rule unanimously for Knight.

Joe Banovic lost to Knight in a ten-round points decision on August 8, 1933, in Laurel, Maryland.  Banovic was down for a count of nine in the fifth, and eight in the sixth.  He opened up in the final round, cutting Knight's face, but it was too late to take the lead in points.

Final attempt at the NBA Light Heavyweight Title, February, 1934
On February 5, 1934, Knight fought a fifteen-round draw before 20,000 in another NBA World Light Heavyweight title match against Maxie Rosenbloom.  The referee and one judge scored the match as a dead heat giving three rounds to each contestant, but Sam Roberts, the remaining judge gave the bout to Knight by the slimmest margin of one round. Rosenbloom employed his common but controversial habit of flicking and backhanding his opponent's face and body with an open glove.  Whether this was a foul or fair determined whether the judges scored Knight or Rosenbloom the winner.  Most ringside, however, felt Knight deserved the winning vote and the title.

Knight lost to Tony Shucco, New England Light Heavyweight Champion, on May 11, 1934, before 3,358, in a close ten-round unanimous decision at Boston Garden.  Knight appeared to have the better of the early bout, but Shucco rallied in the closing rounds.  Through much of the bout, Shucco stood off at long range and flicked jabs at Knight's head to avoid his withering blows.  One reporter gave Shucco only five rounds, Knight four, and one even.

Knight defeated Carl Knowles on June 8, 1934, in a tenth-round technical knockout in a brutal bout in Savannah.  Knight used repeated left hooks with great effect, and waged a masterful defense, either blocking or ducking Knowles's best blows.  Knowles mounted an offensive only in the early rounds.

Buck Everett fell to Knight in a ninth-round technical knockout in Miami on June 11, 1934.  The referee stopped the hard fought battle to prevent further injury to Everett's badly cut left eye, and broken rib.  Everett scored hard rights in the early rounds, and the final rounds featured fierce in-fighting with the boxers only inches apart.  Bob Riley, Everett's manager, was informed in confidence by a Doctor the rib was likely broken after the fourth round, but the bout continued until Riley demanded it end.

Knight achieved a seventh-round technical knockout of Henry Firpo on June 28, 1934, in Washington. Firpo was down for a count of nine in the fourth, though he rallied in the fifth.  The bout was stopped in the seventh when Knight had Firpo down twice.

Knight knocked out Clyde Chastain in six rounds on July 23, 1934, in Miami.  Knight shot a stiff left to the midsection, followed by a hard right that left Chastain on the floor at the fifth round bell.  Charging out at the opening of the sixth, Knight tagged Chastain with a left to the stomach for a count of nine.   When Chastain arose, Knight instantly sent him to the mat for the final time.

In the fall of 1934, the National Boxing Association vacated Maxie Rosenbloom's light heavyweight title. The commissions for North Carolina, Georgia, and Florida named Joe Knight as World Champion. He was featured on the cover of the September 1934 Ring Magazine.

Career decline and loss to Al Gainer

Winning a decisive seventh round technical knockout over Al Rodrigues on October 15, 1934, Knight showcased his powerful left.  Both contestants fought cautiously in the first four rounds. In the fifth, Knight landed a heavy left to Rodrigues's stomach, then immediately dropped him for a count of nine with another to the jaw, bringing an end to the fifth.  Rodriguez was down again in the sixth for a nine count.  Dazed and beaten in the seventh, Rodrigues's seconds threw in the towel to end the bout.

Corn Griffin fell to Knight in a fourth round technical knockout on July 4, 1935.  Both contestants continued to battle after the fourth round bell, and the referee immediately stopped the bout, concerning about bleeding from Griffin's eyes.  Still concerned, the referee prevented Griffin from answering the fifth round bell.

Knight dropped a match to Southpaw and former middleweight champion Al McCoy in Montreal, Canada on September 5, 1935. The bout was for the Montreal Athletic Commission World Light Heavyweight Title, with McCoy winning in a fifteen round Unanimous Decision at Mount Royal Arena. McCoy took eight rounds, Knight three, and the rest were even.

Knight had a devastating loss to the gifted Al Gainer on June 1, 1936, in a ten-round points decision in Millvale, Pennsylvania.    Gainer, who took every round, gave Knight a decisive beating.  Gainer sent Knight to one knee in the third, and staggered him on several occasions.  Beaten and exhausted, Knight remained strictly on defense after the fifth round. Though he would fight on for two more years, he tried to officially retire shortly after the bout.

Fellow Southpaw Melio Bettina won a decisive ten-round decision over Knight at Miami Beach on June 18, 1937.  One reporter noted that Knight had won only three rounds and should consider retirement.  Down for a no count in the sixth, Knight lost decisively on points in the last three rounds.  Never a second-rate boxer, Bettina would contend twice for the NBA World Light Heavyweight championship two years later.  Knight would take six months off, and take four more wins before retiring in 1938.  In his final bout on April 19, 1938, Knight defeated Chet Gideon in a ten-round points decision in Orlando.  Knight had Gideon down once in the ninth and once in the tenth.

Life after boxing
In retirement, Knight promoted fights in Georgia and Florida. He died on July 16, 1976, in Dekalb, Georgia.

Professional boxing record
All information in this section is derived from BoxRec, unless otherwise stated.

Official record

All newspaper decisions are officially regarded as “no decision” bouts and are not counted in the win/loss/draw column.

Unofficial record

Record with the inclusion of newspaper decisions in the win/loss/draw column.

Primary boxing achievements

|-

References

External links
 

1909 births
1976 deaths
Boxers from Georgia (U.S. state)
People from Cairo, Georgia
Light-heavyweight boxers
World light-heavyweight boxing champions
World boxing champions
American male boxers